Sphegina albipes is a species of hoverfly in the family Syrphidae.

Distribution
United States.

References

Eristalinae
Insects described in 1883
Diptera of North America
Taxa named by Jacques-Marie-Frangile Bigot